Ulotrichopus phaeoleucus is a moth of the family Erebidae. It is found in Burundi, the Democratic Republic of Congo (Orientale), Ethiopia, Kenya, Malawi, Tanzania, Uganda and Yemen.

Subspecies
Ulotrichopus phaeoleucus phaeoleucus
Ulotrichopus phaeoleucus griseus Kühne, 2005 (Ethiopia, Yemen)

References

Moths described in 1913
Ulotrichopus
Moths of Africa
Moths of Asia